Aedile (from , "temple edifice") was an elected office of the Roman Republic. Based in Rome, the aediles were responsible for maintenance of public buildings and regulation of public festivals. They also had powers to enforce public order and duties to ensure the city of Rome was well supplied and its civil infrastructure well maintained, akin to modern local government.

There were two pairs of aediles: the first were the "plebeian aediles" (Latin aediles plebis) and possession of this office was limited to plebeians; the other two were "curule aediles" (Latin aediles curules), open to both plebeians and patricians, in alternating years. An aedilis curulis was classified as a magister curulis.

The office of the aedilis was generally held by young men intending to follow the cursus honorum to high political office, traditionally after their quaestorship but before their praetorship. It was not a compulsory part of the cursus, and hence a former quaestor could be elected to the praetorship without having held the position of aedile. However, it was an advantageous position to hold because it demonstrated the aspiring politician's commitment to public service, as well as giving him the opportunity to hold public festivals and games, an excellent way to increase his name recognition and popularity.

History of the office

Plebeian aediles
The plebeian aediles were created in the same year as the tribune of the plebs (494 BC). Originally intended as assistants to the tribunes, they guarded the rights of the plebeians with respect to their headquarters, the Temple of Ceres.  Subsequently, they assumed responsibility for maintenance of the city's buildings as a whole.  Their duties at first were simply ministerial. They were the assistants to the tribunes in whatever matters that the tribunes might entrust to them, although most matters with which they were entrusted were of minimal importance. 

Around 446 BC, they were given the authority to care for the decrees of the Senate. When a senatus consultum was passed, it would be transcribed into a document and deposited in the public treasury, the Aerarium. They were given this power because the consuls, who had held this power before, arbitrarily suppressed and altered the documents. They also maintained the acts of the Plebeian Council (People's Assembly), the "plebiscites". Plebiscites, once passed, were also transcribed into a physical document for storage. While their powers grew over time, it is not always easy to distinguish the difference between their powers, and those of the censors. Occasionally, if a censor was unable to carry out one of his tasks, an aedile would perform the task instead.

Curule aediles
According to Livy (vi. 42), after the passing of the Licinian rogations in 367 BC, an extra day was added to the Roman games; the plebeian aediles refused to bear the additional expense, whereupon the patricians offered to undertake it, on condition that they were admitted to the aedileship. The plebeians accepted the offer, and accordingly two curule aediles were appointed—at first from the patricians alone, then from patricians and plebeians in turn, lastly, from either—at the Tribal Assembly under the presidency of the consul. Curule aediles, as formal magistrates, held certain honors that plebeian aediles (who were not technically magistrates), did not hold. 

Besides having the right to sit on a curule seat (sella curulis) and to wear a toga praetexta, the curule aediles also held the power to issue edicts (jus edicendi). These edicts often pertained to matters such as the regulation of the public markets, or what we might call "economic regulation". Livy suggests, perhaps incorrectly, that both curule as well as plebeian Aediles were sacrosanct. Although the curule aediles always ranked higher than the plebeian, their functions gradually approximated and became practically identical. Within five days after the beginning of their terms, the four aediles (two plebeian, two curule) were required to determine, by lot or by agreement among themselves, what parts of the city each should hold jurisdiction over.

Differences between the two
There was a distinction between the two sets of aediles when it came to public festivals. Some festivals were plebeian in nature, and thus were under the superintendence of plebeian aediles. Other festivals were supervised exclusively by the curule aediles, and it was often with these festivals that the aediles would spend lavishly. This was often done so as to secure the support of voters in future elections. Because aediles were not reimbursed for any of their public expenditures, most individuals who sought the office were independently wealthy. Since this office was a stepping stone to higher office and the Senate, it helped to ensure that only wealthy individuals (mostly landowners) would win election to high office. These extravagant expenditures began shortly after the end of Second Punic War, and increased as the spoils returned from Rome's new eastern conquests. Even the decadence of the emperors rarely surpassed that of the aediles under the Republic, as could have been seen during Julius Caesar's aedileship.

Election to the office
Plebeian aediles were elected by the Plebeian Council, usually while under the presidency of a plebeian tribune. Curule aediles were elected by the Tribal Assembly, usually while under the presidency of a consul. Since the plebeian aediles were elected by the plebeians rather than by all of the people of Rome (plebeians as well as patricians), they were not technically magistrates. Before the passage of the Lex Villia Annalis, individuals could run for the aedileship by the time they turned twenty-seven. After the passage of this law in 180 BC, a higher age was set, probably thirty-five. By the 1st century BC, aediles were elected in July, and took office on the first day in January.

Powers of the office
Cicero (Legg. iii. 3, 7) divides these functions under three heads:

(1) Care of the city:
the repair and preservation of temples, sewers and aqueducts; street cleansing and paving; regulations regarding traffic, dangerous animals and dilapidated buildings; precautions against fire; superintendence of baths and taverns; enforcement of sumptuary laws; punishment of gamblers and usurers; the care of public morals generally, including the prevention of foreign superstitions and the registration of meretrices.  They also punished those who had too large a share of the ager publicus, or kept too many cattle on the state pastures.

(2) Care of provisions:
investigation of the quality of the articles supplied and the correctness of weights and measures; the purchase of grain for disposal at a low price in case of necessity.

(3) Care of the games: 
superintendence and organization of the public games, as well as of those given by themselves and private individuals (e.g., at funerals) at their own expense. 
Ambitious persons often spent enormous sums in this manner to win the popular favor with a view to official advancement.

Under the Empire
In 44 BC, Julius Caesar added two plebeian aediles called cereales, whose special duty was the care of the cereal (grain) supply.  Under Augustus the office lost much of its importance, its judicial functions and the care of the games being transferred to the praetor, while its city responsibilities were limited by the appointment of an urban prefect. Augustus took for himself its powers over various religious duties. By stripping it of its powers over temples, he effectively destroyed the office, by taking from it its original function. After this point, few people were willing to hold such a powerless office, and Augustus was even known to compel individuals into holding the office. He accomplished this by randomly selecting former tribunes and quaestors for the office. Future emperors would continue to dilute the power of the office by transferring its powers to newly created offices. However, the office did retain some powers over licentiousness and disorder, in particular over the baths and brothels, as well as the registration of prostitutes. In the 3rd century, it disappeared altogether.

Under the Empire, Roman colonies and cities often had officials with powers similar to those of the republican aediles, although their powers widely varied. It seems as though they were usually chosen annually.

Modern day
Today in Portugal the county mayor can still be referred to as edil (e.g. 'O edil de Coimbra', meaning 'the mayor of Coimbra'), a way of reference used also in Brazil and in Romania for any mayors (ex. 'Edil al Bucureștiului', meaning 'mayor of Bucharest'). In Spain (and Latin America) the members of municipal councils are called concejales or ediles.

Shakespeare 
In his play Coriolanus, Shakespeare references the aediles. However, they are minor characters, and their chief role is to serve as policemen.

See also

 Aetheling
 Agoranomi
 Constitution of the Roman Republic
 Ethel

References

Books

Cursus honorum
Ancient Roman occupations
Ancient Roman titles